Ashford Hill with Headley is a civil parish in the Basingstoke and Deane district of Hampshire, England.   The parish includes Ashford Hill, Plastow Green, Headley and Kingsclere Woodlands.  According to the 2001 census it had a population of 1,216, increasing to 1,277 at the 2011 Census.

Geography
The parish is bordered on the north by Brimpton in West Berkshire. To the east is the parish of Baughurst, south is the parish of Kingsclere and west is the parish of Ecchinswell, Sydmonton and Bishops Green.

Wildlife
Ashford Hill National nature reserve is a national nature reserve managed by Natural England, adjacent to Ashford Hill village.

References

External links

Parish website
Community Shop Website

Civil parishes in Basingstoke and Deane